The 2023 UCI World Tour is a series of races that include thirty-five road cycling events throughout the 2023 cycling season. The tour started with the Tour Down Under on 17 January, and will conclude with the Tour of Guangxi on 17 October.

Events

References

External links

 
UCI World Tour
World Tour
World Tour